Renée Stobrawa (born Renate Stobrawa; 13 October 1897 in Dresden – 16 August 1971 in Tegernsee) was a German screenwriter and film actress.

Partial filmography

 The Mistress and her Servant (1929) - Frau Matjunke
 Melody of the World (1929, Short, Documentary) - sailor's wife
 Kennst Du das Land (1931) - Theresa
 Hell on Earth (1931) - Frau Kohler
 Cruiser Emden (1932) - Grete
 Victoria in Dover (1936) - Baroness Lehzen
 Dangerous Game (1937) - Natalie
 The Beaver Coat (1937) - Almine Wulkow
 The Muzzle (1938) - Billa, Dienstmädchen
 Skandal um den Hahn (1938) - Frau Lebrecht
 The False Step (1939) - Roswitha
 Salonwagen E 417 (1939) - Freundin des Kompagnons
 Hochzeit mit Hindernissen (1939) - Lotte Jähnisch, Näherin
 Sensationsprozess Casilla (1939) - Fräulein Baumann
 A Woman Like You (1939) - Frau Haucke
 Der Stammbaum des Dr. Pistorius (1939) - Käthe, Giesekings Frau
 Verwandte sind auch Menschen (1940) - Erna Schramm
 Kopf hoch, Johannes! (1941) - Mutter Panse
 Altes Herz wird wieder jung (1943) - Frau Wendisch
 The Buchholz Family (1944) - Adelheid Hampel
 Marriage of Affection (1944) - Adelheid Hampel
 The Degenhardts (1944)
 Wo ist Herr Belling? (1945) - Frau Dr. Lemke
 Blum Affair (1948) - Frieda Bremer
 Girls Behind Bars (1949) - Frau Liebhold
 Das kalte Herz (1950)
 Little Red Riding Hood (1953) - Mutter
 Hansel and Gretel (1954) - Frau Köper
 Mother Holly (1954) - Frau Holle
 Der Struwwelpeter (1955) - Konrads Mama
 Ina, Peter und die Rasselbande (1955) - Frau Schubert
 Cinderella (1955) - Gute Fee / Fairy Godmother
 Dornröschen (1955)
 Tischlein, deck dich (1956) - Kathy's aunt
 Kalle wird Bürgermeister (1957)
 The Goose Girl (1957) - Königin-Mutter
 Rumpelstilzchen (1960) - Weide

External links

1897 births
1971 deaths
German film actresses
German women screenwriters
Actors from Dresden
20th-century German actresses
Film people from Dresden
20th-century German screenwriters